The Palmerston Highway (State Route 25), serves as a link between the southern part of the Atherton Tablelands and the Far North Queensland coastal strip, in Australia. Starting just north of Innisfail, from the Bruce Highway it winds through the Wooroonooran National Park to the township of Millaa Millaa, with no major road junctions. It terminates at an intersection with Old Palmerston Highway and Main Street. Its total length is 54.6 kilometres. From here State Route 25 continues west and then north as Malanda-Millaa Millaa Road, while Old Palmerston Highway (East Evelyn Road - State Route 24) continues south and then west as a Tourist Drive (not suitable for caravans) to where it meets the Kennedy Highway north of Ravenshoe.

See also

 Highways in Australia
 List of highways in Queensland

References

Far North Queensland
Highways in Queensland